4 Real may refer to:
 4Real, a 2008 American TV series on MTV Canada
 4 Real (album), by Crystal Kay, 2003
 "4 Real", a song by Avril Lavigne from Goodbye Lullaby
 "4 Real", a song by YNW Melly from I Am You
 4 Real, a phrase the musician Richey Edwards, of Manic Street Preachers, cut into his arm in 1991

See also
 4Real 4Real, a 2019 album by YG
 For Real (disambiguation)